The London, Tilbury and Southend Railway (LT&SR) 2100 Class was a class of 4-6-4T steam locomotives.  Eight were built in 1912, the year the Midland Railway took over the LT&SR, to the design of Robert Harben Whitelegg.  Hence, they were numbered in the Midland numbering system as 2100–2107, and none received a name.  The Midland gave them the power classification 3P.  All subsequently passed into LMS ownership in 1923.  They were all withdrawn 1929–1934, and all were scrapped.

References 

 Bob Essery The London, Tilbury and Southend Railway and its Locomotives, OPC (2001)

External links
Locomotives by Beyer Peacock & Co. Ltd. - page35

83
4-6-4T locomotives
Beyer, Peacock locomotives
Railway locomotives introduced in 1912
Standard gauge steam locomotives of Great Britain
2′C2′ h2t locomotives

Scrapped locomotives